A cricket team representing the Northamptonshire Cricket Board played six List A cricket matches between 1999 and 2002. This is a list of the players who appeared in those matches.

Richard Ashton, 2 matches, 1999–2000
David Austen, 1 match, 2000
Thomas Baker, 1 match, 2002
Terry Barratt, 1 match, 2001
David Capel, 3 matches, 2001–2002
Tim Coleman, 4 matches, 1999–2002
Jeffrey Cook, 1 match, 1999
Paul Coverdale, 3 matches, 2001–2002
Andrew Daniels, 1 match, 2002
Thomas Dann, 4 matches, 2000–2001
Martyn Dobson, 1 match, 2001
Richard Falkner, 4 matches, 1999–2001
Brenden Fourie, 4 matches, 2001–2002
Jeremy Goode, 1 match, 1999
Dale Iniff, 1 match, 1999
Craig Jennings, 1 match, 2001
Richard Kaufman, 2 matches, 2000–2001
Richard King, 2 matches, 2001–2002
Rob Large, 1 match, 2001
John Mann, 2 matches, 2000–2001
Ross McLean, 2 matches, 2000–2002
Mark Neave, 1 match, 2001
Robert Pack, 2 matches, 1999–2000
Chris Park, 1 match, 2002
David Paynter, 1 match, 2001
David Roberts, 2 matches, 2001
Adam Shantry, 1 match, 2002
Marcus Steed, 4 matches, 2001–2002
Arran Steele, 1 match, 1999
Alec Swann, 1 match, 2000
Raymond Swann, 1 match, 1999
Glenn Thompson, 1 match, 1999
Jamie Wade, 2 matches, 2001
John Wolstenholme, 1 match, 2000
Mark Wolstenholme, 5 matches, 1999–2001

References

Northamptonshire Cricket Board